Public Garden is the second mini-album by Dragon Ash; released in 1997. "Realism II" was used as the theme for Asahi National Broadcasting Co.'s Sports Spotters show.

Track listing

External links
 
 

Dragon Ash albums
1997 EPs
Victor Entertainment EPs